The European Film Award for Best Director is an award given out at the annual European Film Awards to recognize a director who has exhibited outstanding directing while working in a film industry. The award is presented by the European Film Academy (EFA) and was first presented in 1988 to German director Wim Wenders for Wings of Desire.

Michael Haneke is the director with most wins in the category with three, followed by Pedro Almodóvar, Paolo Sorrentino and Paweł Pawlikowski, with two wins each. Almodovar is the most nominated director with six nominations for the award. Danish director Susanne Bier was the first female director to receive the award, winning for In a Better World in 2011.

Winners and nominees

1980s

2000s

2010s

2020s

Multiple wins and nominations

Multiple wins

Most nominations

References

External links
European Film Academy archive

Director
 
Awards for best director
Awards established in 1988